"I'm Lovin' It" is a song by American singer-songwriter Justin Timberlake. The song, originally written as a jingle for American fast food chain McDonald's, was produced by the Neptunes and is credited as being written by Pharrell Williams, Tom Batoy, Franco Tortora, and Andreas Forberger. It was released as a single on November 20, 2003, and became a chart hit in a few European countries, reaching the top 20 in Greece, Ireland, and the Netherlands.

Background
The song was written as a jingle for McDonald's commercials based on a pre-existing German campaign originally developed as "Ich Liebe Es." Timberlake was paid $6 million to sing the jingle; despite this, Timberlake has since regretted the deal. Soon thereafter, the Neptunes produced a song based on the jingle and released it (along with an instrumental version) as part of a three-track EP in November 2003. A digital download EP with the same name was also released through the iTunes Store on December 16, 2003. The extended play included the title-track and a remix for all of the singles from Timberlake's first solo studio album, Justified. The song was also included on the bonus audio CD of Timberlake's first live DVD, Live From London.

Rapper Pusha T revealed his involvement with the song in June 2016 and claimed that he had created the "I'm Lovin' It" jingle. However, co-writers Batoy and Tortora, as well as several others involved with the jingle's creation, have disputed his claim. Nevertheless, Pusha T's rap vocals do appear on the track for the first ad to air with the new hook and slogan; however, he was only paid on a one-time basis without royalties.

Music video
A music video to promote the single was released in late 2003 and was directed by Paul Hunter. In the video, Timberlake is seen chasing a girl played by Lindsay Frimodt around New York City.

Track listings
 European CD single 
 "I'm Lovin' It" – 3:42
 "I'm Lovin' It" (instrumental) – 3:42
 "Last Night" – 4:47

 Digital download EP
 "I'm Lovin' It" – 3:48
 "Rock Your Body" (Sander Kleinenberg Just in the Club mix) – 9:42
 "Cry Me a River" (Dirty Vegas vocal mix) – 8:21
 "Like I Love You" (Basement Jaxx vocal mix) – 6:12
 "Señorita" (Num Club mix) – 7:53

Credits and personnel
Credits are lifted from the European CD single liner notes.

Studio
 Recorded at Hovercraft Recording Studios (Virginia, US), The Hit Factory Criteria (Miami, Florida, US), and the Record Plant (Los Angeles, California, US)
 Mixed at MixStar Studios (Virginia Beach, Virginia, US)
 Mastered at The Hit Factory (New York City, US)

Personnel

 Pharrell Williams – writing, all instruments
 Tom Batoy – writing
 Franco Tortora – writing
 Andreas Forberger – writing
 Chad Hugo – all instruments
 The Neptunes – production
 Andrew Coleman – recording
 Brian Garten – recording (Record Plant)

 Serban Ghenea – mixing
 John Hanes – additional Pro Tools engineer
 Daniel Betancourt – assistant engineer
 Steve Robillard – assistant engineer
 Jun Ishizeki – assistant engineer
 Tim Roberts – assistant engineer
 Herb Powers, Jr. – mastering
 Fredrik Peterhoff – art direction

Charts

Release history

References

2003 singles
2003 songs
Jive Records singles
Justin Timberlake songs
McDonald's advertising
Music videos directed by Paul Hunter (director)
Song recordings produced by the Neptunes
Songs used as jingles
Songs written by Pharrell Williams